Cedar Point is a  amusement park located on a Lake Erie peninsula in Sandusky, Ohio, United States. Opened in 1870, it is considered the second-oldest operating amusement park in the U.S. behind Lake Compounce. Cedar Point is owned and operated by Cedar Fair and is the flagship of the amusement park chain. Known as "America's Roller Coast", the park features 15 roller coasters – fourth-most in the world with Six Flags Great America, behind Canada's Wonderland and Energylandia (17), as well as Six Flags Magic Mountain (20). Cedar Point's most recent roller coaster, Steel Vengeance, opened to the public on May 5, 2018.

Cedar Point's normal operating season runs from early May until Labor Day in September, after which it reopens only on weekends through Halloween, featuring events such as HalloWeekends. Other attractions near the park include a  white-sand beach, an outdoor water park called Cedar Point Shores, an indoor water park called Castaway Bay, two marinas, an outdoor sports complex called Cedar Point Sports Center, and several nearby resorts.

The park has reached several milestones. Prior to the retirement of Top Thrill Dragster in 2022, it was the only amusement park in the world with five roller coasters that are at least  in height – Magnum XL-200, Millennium Force, Valravn, Steel Vengeance, and Top Thrill Dragster – as well as the only one with roller coasters in all four height classifications. Cedar Point also received the Golden Ticket Award for "Best Amusement Park in the World" from Amusement Today for 16 consecutive years from 1997 to 2013. The park is in the top 20 amusement parks in the United States with an estimated 3.6 million visitors in 2017. The park also has several buildings that are listed on the National Register of Historic Places.

History

In the late-19th century, the south shore region of Lake Erie became a popular vacation destination for the emerging middle-class in the United States. The Lake's islands, such as Kelleys Island and South Bass Island, were gaining a reputation for their freshwater bathing resorts. The Cedar Point peninsula, named for its abundance of cedar trees, was originally known for its fishing. Local fishermen leased land and built living quarters there. Sandusky, which featured an important shipping harbor and two railroads, transformed into a major economic center over the next three decades. Railroad and steamship travel supported an emerging tourism industry, and rapid development of the area began.

In the 1860s during the American Civil War, housing for a battery of four field artillery pieces was constructed at the tip of the peninsula. It was used to defend a prison for Confederate soldiers on nearby Johnson's Island. Louis Zistel, a German immigrant, built two boats to transport the prisoners. In 1870, he began to ferry locals to the Cedar Point peninsula, which opened as a public bathing beach. Zistel opened a bathhouse on the north shore of the peninsula and the same year built a beer garden with a small dance floor. He charged 25 cents per person to ride from Sandusky to Cedar Point on his boat, Young Reindeer.

In 1878 James West opened a group of bathhouses near the beach. Although there was no steamboat service, private boats often docked and sailboats anchored just offshore. By 1880 a local newspaper observed that the popularity of the beach was increasing and picnicking on the grounds had become a popular pastime. The popularity of the peninsula attracted the attention of Benjamin F. Dwelle and Captain William Slackford who leased land on the peninsula in 1882 and built eight new bathhouses, a dance hall and wooden walkways on the beach. The steamboats R.B. Hayes and Lutts provided transport to Biemiller's Cove and Cedar Point Light. Building on early success, Dwelle and Slackford continued to expand the offerings for their visitors each year and added picnic tables, cleared acres of brush, and built a baseball diamond. After Slackford became ill in 1888, Dwelle entered into a more lucrative partnership with Adam Stoll and Louis Adolph, who owned land at Cedar Point, along with investors Charles Baetz and Jacob Kuebeler. The partnership's first venture was constructing a Grand Pavilion, which opened the same year in 1888 and marked the first concerted effort to operate the peninsula as a public resort. It was a two-story theater and concert hall with a bowling alley and photographer's studio. The building was recognized for its unusual architecture and still stands in the park. The first amusement ride at Cedar Point, a water toboggan ride consisting of a ramp that launched riders into Lake Erie, opened in 1890. Electricity was installed at Cedar Point in 1891. The first roller coaster, Switchback Railway, opened the following year. The Switchback Railway was designed as two identical tracks side-by-side – one for the ride down and the other for the train to be hauled back to the top by the ride attendant.

Boeckling era

The company appointed George A. Boeckling, a businessman from Indiana, as the park's new manager. Under his tenure, the peninsula was transformed from a picnic ground into a nationally recognized amusement park and resort destination.

The second roller coaster at Cedar Point, the Figure-Eight Roller Toboggan, debuted in 1902. It was moved several years later and renamed The Racer. A pony track was built near the beach the same year. Mosquitos were an issue, so in 1904, the park hired the Detroit Dredging Company to drain swampy areas on the peninsula, thereby connecting a series of lagoons to form a water passageway that quickly became one of the park's signature attractions. Aside from sightseeing passenger boats, the passageway was used to transport coal to power plants near the center of the peninsula. The historic Hotel Breakers opened in 1905 as one of the largest hotels in the Midwest; it had 600 guest rooms and a cafe that could seat 400 guests. A new area of the park called "Amusement Circle" was designed in 1906 to link the pier to the beach. It was located southeast of the Coliseum, a large arena built the same year that featured a grand ballroom and other attractions.

The Dip the Dips Scenic Railway roller coaster opened in 1908, but it was soon overshadowed by the larger Leap the Dips ride that opened in 1912. In 1917, Dip the Dips was razed and replaced by the Leap Frog Scenic Railway. With a  growing assortment of rides including three roller coasters, Cedar Point was beginning to grow as an amusement park. However, that wasn't a priority for Boeckling. He marketed the peninsula primarily as a bathing resort complete with shows, exhibits, motion pictures and other forms of entertainment, but did not place emphasis on the park's rides.

Several additional hotels and restaurants were constructed in the remaining years of Boeckling's tenure, including Hotel Cedars, White House Hotel, Crystal Rock Castle and Crystal Gardens Ballroom. Cedar Point continued to update its ride attractions, replacing the Racer, the Circle Swing, and other rides to make way for a Shoot-the-Chutes water ride, a Tilt-A-Whirl, and fun houses such as Noah's Ark and Bluebeard's Palace. The Cyclone, a rickety and rough coaster, opened in 1929. Boeckling, who was still attempting to expand the park, died from uremia on July 24, 1931.

After Boeckling: the George A. Roose era

Edward Smith took over Cedar Point's management after Boeckling's death. As a result of the Great Depression, little expansion happened through the 1930s. One of the few rides built in during this time was the Tumble Bug. The decaying Leap the Dips coaster was demolished in the mid-1930s. After the 1938 season, the directors had the second floor of the Coliseum modernized in the art deco style with a new stage. In the middle, the giant dance floor remained. Some of the top bands of the time played in the ballroom. As a result, it kept Cedar Point operating through the rest of the Depression. Momma Berardi's Home Made French Fries came to Cedar Point, Momma Berardi's family played an important role in the food industry at Cedar Point. Momma Berardi's fries were sold there from 1942 until 1978, winning four Reader's Choice Awards.

By the end of World War II, Cedar Point was in need of financial help. The wood of the Cyclone roller coaster was rotting, the boardwalk was cracked in many places, and the fishing dock was in need of repair. In 1946, Cedar Point's oldest still-existing ride, the Midway Carousel, was installed. By 1951, the Cyclone coaster was razed because of its poor condition, leaving the resort without a roller coaster. As the Cyclone was being removed, the Laff-in-the-Dark, Rocket Ships, and Loop-A-Plane attractions were installed. Cedar Point Causeway was built in 1957 and is still in use. The president of Cedar Point, Bernie Zeiher, was replaced by George Roose around 1958, and Emile Legros was elected chairman that same year.

In the 1950s, the Pagoda Gift Shop was a post-office and the Crystal Rock Castle was turned into a maintenance shop in the late-1950s. The park's first roller coaster since the Cyclone, the Wild Mouse, was built. The resort also got a new kind of ride, a monorail, that was the most popular ride in 1959. Breakers Hotel was restored and the neglected cottages were demolished. The Coliseum and Grand Pavilion were both painted and remodeled. The Crystal Rock Castle Maintenance Shop, bathhouses, and the old powerhouse were demolished, and a new $50,000 bathhouse, boiler house, and maintenance shop were built in their place.

In the 1960s, the idea of "pay one price" season passes became common. On March 28, 1960, Cedar Point announced plans to transform the park into a "Disneyland" amusement center. Those plans fell through, however. Cedar Point & Lake Erie Railroad opened in 1963, transporting passengers from the middle of the park to the back. In 1964, Cedar Point built its oldest surviving roller coaster, the Blue Streak. It was named after the local high school's sports teams, the Sandusky Blue Streaks. Jungle Larry's Safari Island was a well-known attraction that operated from 1965 until 1994 despite the death of Jungle Larry in 1984. The Cedar Creek Mine Ride opened in 1969; it is currently the second oldest roller coaster at Cedar Point.

In 1970, the Centennial Theatre, named in honor of Cedar Point's 100th anniversary, was built. 1972 brought Giant Wheel and the now-defunct Jumbo Jet coaster, which was noted for being the fastest coaster at that time. In 1975, Robert L. Munger Jr. took over as president of Cedar Point after Roose retired. The record-breaking Corkscrew roller coaster was built in 1976; it was the first roller coaster to span a midway and have three inversions. Gemini opened in 1978 and was advertised as the tallest, fastest and steepest roller coaster in the world. A kiddie coaster, named Jr. Gemini (now known as Wilderness Run), opened the following year across from the Gemini. White Water Landing opened in 1982, replacing the original Shoot the Rapids log flume. In 1983, Demon Drop was built at the front of the park. Avalanche Run opened in 1985 close to the beach and would later be re-themed as Disaster Transport. That same year, the San Francisco Earthquake Ride was transformed into the Berenstain Bear Country.

Dick Kinzel era

Robert L. Munger Jr, president and chief executive officer (CEO) of Cedar Fair, stepped down in 1986 due to health issues and was replaced by Richard "Dick" Kinzel. Thunder Canyon, a river rafting ride manufactured by Intamin, also opened in 1986. In 1987, Iron Dragon, a suspended roller coaster, debuted on the Million Dollar Midway near the Cedar Point & Lake Erie Railroad station. In 1988, Soak City (now known as Cedar Point Shores), Cedar Point's outdoor water park, was constructed near Hotel Breakers. It featured speed slides, more than 10 body and tube slides, a family raft ride, a water playhouse, and two lazy rivers.

Several new rides and roller coasters opened at Cedar Point from 1989 to 2011 that were record-breakers. Magnum XL-200 debuted in 1989, setting world records for height and speed. Magnum is often credited as shifting the focus of Cedar Point, as noted by then-park Vice President, John Hildebrandt: "We all were smart enough to know we had something. Big steel made a big difference and with Magnum we started branding ourselves as a big time roller coaster park". For the 1990 season, Avalanche Run was transformed into Disaster Transport; the ride was fully enclosed and special effects were added. In subsequent years, the special effects and theming were removed, leaving the ride almost completely dark. Mean Streak opened in 1991 as the northernmost attraction in the park. Challenge Park was built between Hotel Breakers and Soak City in 1992. Challenge Park included RipCord, Skyscraper, and two eighteen-hole mini-golf courses.

Snake River Falls was constructed in 1993 as a result of Soak City's popularity. At the bottom of the hill, the ride ended with a splash landing that created a large wave, which splashed spectators on an overlooking bridge. It opened as the tallest and fastest water ride in the world. In 1994, Cedar Point installed Raptor. The Mill Race log flume was removed from the park, and the circular Calypso was relocated to make room for Raptor, the first inverted roller coaster to feature a cobra roll. In December 1994, the park held its only Christmas in the Park. The Midway Carousel was open, a horse-drawn carriage gave behind-the-scenes tours of the park and the midway held many Christmas festivals, including a Christmas tree. In 1996, Cedar Point opened Mantis, then the tallest, steepest, and fastest stand-up roller coaster in the world. Originally, the ride was to be called "Banshee", but it was later changed after negative public reaction. The discarded name would later be reused for Banshee at Kings Island in 2014. In 1997, the park introduced HalloWeekends, a Halloween-themed event with haunted houses and mazes, which typically operates from September through late October. Camp Snoopy debuted in 1999 featuring eight Snoopy-themed attractions, with the exception of a Tilt-A-Whirl. The area also features a junior roller coaster built by Vekoma, Woodstock Express.

Cedar Point built the first giga coaster, Millennium Force, in 2000. In 2002, Wicked Twister opened as the tallest, fastest, and longest inverted impulse roller coaster of its kind. In the midst of a highly-competitive industry with other parks, Cedar Point again set new records the following year with the debut of Top Thrill Dragster, which opened as the tallest and fastest roller coaster in the world in 2003. Kingda Ka at Six Flags Great Adventure broke both records two years later. maXair debuted in 2005 as only the second HUSS Giant Frisbee ride in the United States. Dan Keller also retired in 2005 as vice president and general manager. He was replaced by John Hildebrandt, who had been the vice president and general manager of Dorney Park & Wildwater Kingdom since May 2004.

In 2006, Skyhawk was built next to Snake River Falls; it is currently the tallest Screamin' Swing in the world. In 2008, Cedar Point introduced Planet Snoopy, a kids' area constructed on the site of Peanuts Playground; it consists of family and children's rides relocated from Cedar Point's sister park Geauga Lake after it closed. The area also consisted of a "Kids Only" restaurant called Joe Cool Cafe, which had a small menu for adults. Starlight Experience, a night-time LED light extravaganza with floats themed to the four seasons, debuted in 2009. The $1,000,000 attraction took place on the Frontier Trail nightly beginning at twilight. In 2010, Cedar Point added a new flume ride on the park's Frontier Trail named Shoot the Rapids, which included two drops and a three-minute journey through a rustic, western-themed environment. It was removed in February 2016 following a history of low ridership and a serious incident in 2013 injuring seven riders. WindSeeker did not open on time due to construction delays and opened to the public on June 14, 2011.

Matt Ouimet era

On June 20, 2011, Cedar Fair announced that Dick Kinzel would retire on January 3, 2012, and Matt Ouimet would become the CEO of the company. Ouimet was employed by The Walt Disney Company for 17 years, including tenures as president of Disney Cruise Line and the Disneyland Resort.

In 2012, Cedar Point added Dinosaurs Alive!, a walk-through exhibit featuring approximately 50 life-size animatronic dinosaurs. It was located on Adventure Island and replaced the Paddlewheel Excursions boat cruise ride. Dinosaurs Alive! was replaced with Forbidden Frontier after the 2018 season. A six-lane mat racer slide complex called Dragster H2O was added to Soak City. The slides around Dragster H2O were repainted and the Speed Slides were dismantled to make room for Dragster H2O. Cedar Point also introduced Fast Lane, their version of a fast-pass system, and a new nighttime show, Luminosity – Ignite the Night!. Cedar Point also removed WildCat for the 2012 season to make room for Luminosity. This was the first time since 1978 that a roller coaster was removed from Cedar Point.

On July 13, 2012, Cedar Point announced the removal of Disaster Transport and Space Spiral. Exactly a month later, Cedar Point announced GateKeeper, the longest wing coaster in the world, which opened on May 11, 2013. Along with GateKeeper, a new main entrance plaza was constructed, replacing the entrance that was built in the 1960s. It features two -tall support columns that the GateKeeper trains go through. Cedar Point invested $60 million in its resort hotels over the next three years, starting in the 2013–2014 offseason. At the end of the 2013 season, John Hildebrandt retired as the park's general manager and was replaced by Jason McClure, the former vice president and general manager of Dorney Park & Wildwater Kingdom.

Two new family attractions called Pipe Scream and Lake Erie Eagles were added in 2014, along with a pay-per-ride thrill ride named SlingShot. Camp Snoopy and the Gemini Midway underwent renovations the same year, and some rides within those areas were relocated and given new themes. In 2015, the stand-up coaster Mantis was transformed into a floorless roller coaster called Rougarou, receiving new trains and a new green and orange paint scheme in the process. Also in 2015, Hotel Breakers received a $25-million renovation. A new roller coaster called Valravn debuted in 2016 as the tallest, fastest, and longest dive coaster in the world. The  ride replaced the 40-year-old Good Time Theater along with an antique car ride known as Turnpike Cars. Calypso was also moved in the process to the beach area near GateKeeper, where it was renamed Tiki Twirl. Raptor and Top Thrill Dragster were repainted as well.

As the 2016 season came to a close, Cedar Point announced that Mean Streak would close permanently on September 16, 2016, although park officials declined to confirm that it was being torn down. The park teased subtle hints over the following year that the roller coaster was in fact being refurbished. In August 2017, Cedar Point officially confirmed that Mean Streak would reemerge as Steel Vengeance in 2018.

The park was set to celebrate its "150th Anniversary Season" in 2020, introducing a new family boat ride attraction called Snake River Expedition. However, both the celebration and the new ride's debut were postponed until 2021 as a result of the COVID-19 pandemic.

In April 2021, Carrie Boldman became vice president and the first female general manager in Cedar Point history. Halloweekends returned in 2021 with an expanded operating calendar, which included Halloween Haunt and Tricks and Treats Fall Fest. Wicked Twister closed permanently on September 6, 2021, to make room for future development. An incident at Top Thrill Dragster in August 2021 resulted in a serious injury to a guest waiting in line. The Ohio Department of Agriculture conducted an investigation, and the ride never reopened, with Cedar Point announcing its retirement in September 2022. The park has teased that a "new and reimagined ride experience" was being created without providing further detail.

Park timeline

 1870: New bathing resort and beer garden opens to the public on Cedar Point peninsula.
 1882: Improvements near Biemiller's Cove including new walkways and picnic areas. Eight more bathhouses and the resort's first dancehall is built. New dock with additional steamboats providing transportation service.
 1884: Great Western Band first performs at Grove on lakeshore
 1888: The two-story Grand Pavilion opens, featuring a theater, concert hall, bowling alleys, and dining amenities.
 1894: New beach amenities including a pony track, diving platform, and bicycle boats.
 1897: Beginning of George A. Boeckling era when he becomes park manager.
 1899: Bay Short Hotel, Cedar Point's first hotel, opens
 1901: The White House hotel featuring 55 rooms opens on Sandusky Bay. Bay Shore Hotel begins operating as a boarding house.
 1902: Figure-Eight Roller Toboggan opens
 1903: The White House hotel expands to 125 rooms
 1905: Hotel Breakers opens, a 600-room hotel considered one of the largest in the Midwest
 1906: A large coliseum opens along with Amusement Circle
 1907: Switchback Railway closes
 1908: Dip the Dips Scenic Railway opens
 1910: Figure-Eight Roller Toboggan moved and rebuilt, reopening as Racer
 1912: Leap the Dips opens
 1915: The White House hotel renamed Cedars Hotel following a renovation
 1917: Dip the Dips Scenic Railway closes
 1918: Scenic Railway reopens as Leap Frog Railway
 1925: Noah's Ark opens
 1928: Racer closes
 1929: Cedar Point Cyclone roller coaster designed by Harry Traver opens featuring a  lift hill
 1933: Leap Frog Railway renamed High Frolics
 1934: Tumble Bug opens
 1935: Leap the Dips closes
 1940: High Frolics closes
 1946: Midway Carrousel opens
 1951: Cyclone closes
 1952: Super Coaster opens
 1955: Fascination opens
 1957: The Cedar Point Causeway opens
 1958: Cadillac Cars open
 1959: Monorail, Turnpike Cars, and Wild Mouse opens; Noah's Ark closes; Construction is completed on the Cedar Point Marina

 1960: Scrambler opens
 1961: Sky wheel, Rotor, and Super Jets (later renamed Star Voyager) open
 1962: Sky Ride and Scamper opens
 1963: Cedar Point & Lake Erie Railroad and Mill Race open; Wild Mouse closes
 1964: Blue Streak and Western Cruise (later renamed Paddlewheel Excursions) open
 1965: Space Spiral, Earthquake, and Jungle Larry's African Safari open
 1966: Pirate Ride, Trabant, and Upside Down Funhouse opens; Eden Musee closes
 1967: Cedar Downs Racing Derby, Second Rotor, Sealand Marine exhibit, Shoot-the-Rapids, and Frontiertown open; Super Coaster closes
 1968: Frontier Lift, Kiddieland Carousel and Sky Slide open
 1969: Cedar Creek Mine Ride, Antique Cars, and the Town Hall Museum open; Scamper closes
 1970: WildCat, Bayern Kurve, Dodgem No. 2, Monster, Schwabinchen, Calypso, Super Himilaya, Centennial Theatre, Kiddy Kingdom, and Tiki Twirl open, Cedar Point celebrates the park's 100th anniversary
 1971: Frontier Trail and Camper Village RV Campground open; Zugspitze closes
 1972: Frontiertown Carousel, Jumbo Jet, Giant Wheel, and Matterhorn open
 1975: The Cedar Point Cinema opens
 1976: Corkscrew and Troika open
 1977: Witches' Wheel opens
 1978: Gemini opens; Jumbo Jet closes
 1979: Jr. Gemini and Wave Swinger open

 1980: Oceana Dolphin stadium opens; Sky Wheel closes; 
 1981: Ocean Motion opens; Sky Wheel, Funhouse and Shoot-the-Rapids close
 1982: White Water Landing and Kid Arthur's Court open
 1983: Demon Drop opens
 1984: Tiki Twirl, Rotor, Bayern Curve and Earthquake close
 1985: Avalanche Run and Berenstain Bear Country indoor complex opens; Frontier Lift closes; WildCat, Matterhorn and Super Himalaya moved to make room for Avalanche Run; Schwabinchen relocated near Ocean Motion
 1986: Thunder Canyon opens; Sir Rub-A-Dub's Tubs added to Kiddy Kingdom
 1987: Iron Dragon opens; Monster is relocated to make room for Iron Dragon; Western Cruise station is moved and renamed Paddlewheel Excursions to make room for Iron Dragon
 1988: Soak City water park opens
 1989: Magnum XL-200 opens
 1990: Sandcastle Suites; Main Stream and Tadpole Town added to Soak City; Trabant closes; Avalanche Run is transformed into Disaster Transport
 1991: Mean Streak opens; Sky Slide closes
 1992: Challenge Park opens; outdoor complex added to Berenstain Bear Country
 1993: Snake River Falls opens; Mill Race closes
 1994: Raptor opens; Jungle Larry's African Safari closes; Calypso and Midway Carousel relocated to make room for Raptor; Turnpike Cars reduced to make room for Raptor; Christmas in the Park is held for the first and last time
 1995: Zoom Flume and laser light show added; Renegade River and Choo-Choo Lagoon debut in Soak City; Breakers East is added to Hotel Breakers
 1996: Mantis and Ripcord open; Pirate Ride closes
 1997: Chaos opens; Soak city expansion; Debut of HalloWeekends as an annual event
 1998: Power Tower opens; Bumper Boats relocated from Kiddy Kingdom to Gemini Midway
 1999: Camp Snoopy opens; Breakers Tower is added to Hotel Breakers; Super Himalaya relocated to make room for Camp Snoopy; Oceana Dolphin stadium is renamed The Aquatic Stadium; Kid Arthur's Court closes

 2000: Millennium Force and Breakers Express open; Giant Wheel relocated to make room for Millennium Force.
 2001: Lighthouse Point opens; The Aquarium closes; VertiGo is open 4 months before being demolished, Dodgem No.1 and Fascination close.
 2002: Wicked Twister opens; "Snoopy Rocks! On Ice" ice skating show debuts; Cedar Point Cinema is converted into Good Time Theatre; Schwabinchen closes.
 2003: Top Thrill Dragster opens; Swan Boats close; Troika and Chaos relocated to make room for Top Thrill Dragster.
 2004: $10 million in capital improvements across the park including Lighthouse Point expansion and Splash City being added to Soak City.
 2005: maXair opens; White Water Landing closes.
 2006: Skyhawk opens; Hot Summer Lights nighttime show.
 2007: Maverick opens; Peanuts Playground closes.
 2008: Planet Snoopy and SkyScraper open; the Aquatic Stadium is renamed Extreme Sports Stadium with new show, All Wheels Extreme.
 2009: Starlight Experience opens; Demon Drop closes.
 2010: Shoot the Rapids opens; Chaos closes.
 2011: WindSeeker opens; Ocean Motion relocated to make room for WindSeeker; Paddlewheel Excursions, WildCat, and Speed Slides in Soak City close.
 2012: Dinosaurs Alive! opens; Dragster H2O added to Soak City; Fast Lane is introduced; Iron Dragon Midway renamed Celebration Plaza with new show, Luminosity – Ignite the Night!; Disaster Transport and Space Spiral close.
 2013: GateKeeper opens; new entrance plaza debuts; Bumper Boats closes.
 2014: Pipe Scream, Lake Erie Eagles, and SlingShot open with renovated Gemini Midway; Frog Hopper becomes Woodstock's Airmail and relocates to Camp Snoopy; Jr. Gemini entrance moves to Camp Snoopy and renamed Wilderness Run; Mantis, Turnpike Cars, Sir Rub-a-Dubs Tubs and Good Time Theatre close.
 2015: Mantis reopens as Rougarou, a floorless coaster; Hotel Breakers finishes renovation; Calypso relocated and renamed Tiki Twirl; Dodgem relocates and cars are replaced with more padding; Maverick gets new restraints; Challenge Racing, Skyscraper, and Shoot the Rapids close.
 2016: Valravn and a new restaurant called Frontier Inn open; Raptor and Top Thrill Dragster repainted; Mean Streak, Challenge Park, Challenge Golf, and Choo Choo Lagoon at Soak City close. 
 2017: Soak City renamed Cedar Point Shores following expansion; Hotel Breakers expands; Breakers Express expands and becomes Cedar Point's Express Hotel; Cedar Point Sports Center complex opens; RipCord renamed Professor Delbert's Frontier Fling and relocated; Sandcastle Suites and Extreme Sports Stadium close; Last performance of Luminosity – Ignite the Night!.
 2018: Mean Streak reopens as Steel Vengeance; Dinosaurs Alive! and Witches' Wheel close.
 2019: Forbidden Frontier opens; Cedars dorms (formerly Cedars Hotel) is demolished.
 2021: Snake River Expedition opens; Antique Cars in Frontier Town and Wicked Twister close.
 2022: Top Thrill Dragster retirement announced.
 2023: Wild Mouse opens alongside the brand new Boardwalk area which replaces the Lakeside Midway. Matterhorn and Scrambler relocated to Boardwalk with Scrambler being renamed Atomic Scrambler. Tiki Twirl is renamed back to Calypso.

Sources:

List of attractions

Roller coasters
, Cedar Point features 15 roller coasters.

Thrill rides
Cedar Point has 16 thrill rides. The newest is SlingShot, which was introduced in 2014.

Family rides 
Cedar Point has 7 family rides/attractions.

Water rides
Cedar Point has three water rides, excluding attractions located in Cedar Point Shores.

Children rides

Kiddy Kingdom opened in 1970 as Kiddieland but was renamed in 1993. It is located near Gatekeeper and contains 11 rides.

Planet Snoopy is a children's area that opened in 2008. All of its rides were relocated from the defunct Geauga Lake amusement park, with the exception of Joe Cools Dodgem School. It is located near WindSeeker and contains eight rides.

Camp Snoopy opened in 1999 and is located near the entrance to Snake River Expedition. It contains seven rides and two kiddie coasters.

Cedar Point Shores

Cedar Point's water park opened in 1988 as Soak City and was renamed Cedar Point Shores following an announcement on August 18, 2016. It is adjacent to Cedar Point and requires separate admission.

Fast Lane

Fast Lane, introduced at Cedar Point in 2012, is a secondary queue system that offers shorter wait times on the park's most popular rides. In addition to the standard admission charge, visitors can bypass the standard wait line by purchasing a wristband that grants access to the Fast Lane queue. A “limited” number of wristbands are sold each day. The two options available for purchase are "Fast Lane" and "Fast Lane Plus". The standard Fast Lane offers access to 22 attractions, while Fast Lane Plus covers the same rides and adds Valravn, Maverick, Millennium Force, and Steel Vengeance.

Beginning in the 2014 season, Cedar Point offers a Halloween-themed version of Fast Lane called Fright Lane, available during HalloWeekends. This version provides priority access to haunted attractions within the park.

Awards/rankings

Awards
Cedar Point won the Golden Ticket Award from Amusement Today for "Best Amusement Park in the World" for 16 consecutive years from 1997 to 2013. The park has also placed in categories for "Friendliest Park Staff" (2002, 2004 – 2006), "Cleanest Park" (2004, 2005), "Best Capacity" (1998–2002), "Best Kid's Area" (2004, 2013), "Best Outdoor Night Production" (2004–2007), "Best Shows" (2004, 2005), "Best Games Area" (2002), "Best Souvenirs" (2002), and "Best Halloween Event" (2005 – 2008, 2013, 2014). The park also won the Golden Ticket Award for "Best New Ride of 2007" with the roller coaster Maverick. Cedar Point has also won several IAAPA awards, including the Applause Award in 1996.

Rankings

Cedar Point's roller coasters have consistently ranked high in the Golden Ticket Awards. In the 2013 rankings, GateKeeper debuted at 28th, marking the first time that the park had six steel roller coasters in the top 50. Later, the number changed to five, which are all in the top 25. The following steel and wooden coasters were ranked by Amusement Today in 2019:

Steel
 Millennium Force: 2nd
 Steel Vengeance: 3rd
 Maverick: 13th
 Magnum XL-200: 18th
 Top Thrill Dragster: 21st

Wooden
 Blue Streak: 38th

Attendance
In 1960, the park's attendance reached 1 million for the first time. Five years later, the attendance reached 2 million. In 1975, attendance reached 3 million for the first time. Cedar Point's attendance peaked in 1994 with 3.6 million visitors, a feat not matched again until 2016. In 2017, the park was ranked fourteenth overall in North America for attendance and first in the United States among seasonal amusement parks, with an estimated 3.6 million visitors.

Resorts
Cedar Point owns and operates six resorts, several of which are located on park grounds. Guests staying at the resorts are given early access to the park before it opens to the general public, during which time a select number of rides are available such as Steel Vengeance and Millennium Force. Cedar Point invested $60 million over the course of three years renovating many of the resorts, beginning in 2013.

On-site resorts, marina, and campgrounds

Hotel Breakers, built in 1905, is the oldest resort at Cedar Point and the closest one to the park. It has undergone numerous renovations over the years, with the most recent occurring in 2015 that cost Cedar Fair an estimated $50 million. The resort features over 650 rooms and suites, as well as a variety of outdoor amenities including live entertainment and beach activities.

Lighthouse Point, located along the west bank of the peninsula, contains 64 cottages and 40 cabins. The centerpiece of Lighthouse Point is the Cedar Point Light, which was built in 1862 and is the oldest existing structure on the peninsula.

Camper Village is the only overnight location that provides accommodations for recreational vehicles (RV). Deluxe sites offer electricity, water, sewer and cable. Amenities include the Camper Village Store, an outdoor pool, a shuffleboard court, and a game room.

The Cedar Point Marina is located on the Sandusky Bay side of the peninsula, directly adjacent to the amusement park. It offers amenities geared toward boaters such as fuel docks and a floating pier. Other amenities include on-site restaurants and stores.

Off-site Cedar Point-owned resorts
Castaway Bay is an indoor waterpark resort opened by Cedar Fair in November 2004.

Opened in 2000, it is the closest off-site hotel to the peninsula and includes over 400 guest rooms.

Sawmill Creek by Cedar Point Resorts, located in nearby Huron, Ohio, is a nearby resort purchased by Cedar Fair for $13.5 million in 2019. Amenities include restaurants, shopping, a conference center, and an 18-hole golf course.

National Register of Historic Places

Cedar Point features several historic buildings on the peninsula. Many of the buildings and structures on the peninsula are from the late 1800s or early 1900s. The oldest structure on the peninsula is the Cedar Point Light. It is a restored lighthouse that was built in 1862 and was added to the National Register of Historic Places (NRHP) on July 19, 1984. Located along the main midway is the Coliseum. The Coliseum was built in 1906 with the newly expanded Midway. It has a ballroom known for holding several dances that helped Cedar Point out of The Depression. It was added to the NRHP on October 2, 1982.  Another building that is listed on the NRHP is the U.S. Coast Guard Building located along Perimeter Road that stretches around the peninsula.

All three of Cedar Point's carousels are listed on the National Register of Historic Places. The Midway Carousel, otherwise known as the Daniel C. Muller Carousel, is located at the front of the park. It opened in 1912 and was brought to Cedar Point in 1946. A Sandusky family purchased the ride and operated it at the park. It became the property of Cedar Point in 1963. It is Cedar Point's oldest operating ride and was added to the NRHP on October 20, 1982.  The second carousel at the park is the Cedar Downs Racing Derby, also known as the Great American Racing Derby. It originally opened at Euclid Beach Park in 1921 and was transported to Cedar Point for the 1967 season. It is only one of two racing carousels still operating in the United States, and was added to the NRHP on November 8, 1990. The third carousel is the Kiddy Kingdom Carousel, located in Kiddy Kingdom. It is also known as William H. Dentzel 1924 Carousel and opened at Cedar Point in 1968. It was added to the NRHP on November 8, 1990.

Cedar Point used to have a fourth carousel located in Frontiertown, next to the Wave Swinger. It was known as the Frontier Carousel or William H. Dentzel 1921 Carousel. It opened at Cedar Point in 1972 when it was bought from a family in Lansing, Michigan. It was listed on the NRHP on November 8, 1990. After the 1994 season, the carousel closed and was moved to Dorney Park & Wildwater Kingdom, where it now operates under the name Antique Carousel. Its building is currently used for the HalloWeekends attraction, Eternity Infirmary.

Former
Cedar Point's oldest hotel is the Hotel Breakers. It opened in 1905 during the "golden age" of resort hotels. It was added to the NRHP on March 9, 1987. After several major alterations, most notably the Breakers Tower in 1998, the National Park Service removed the Hotel Breakers from the NRHP on August 7, 2001.

In popular culture
Cedar Point has had a cultural influence on American society as evidenced in many forms of media such as books, television, and film. In the 1940 biographical film Knute Rockne, All American documenting the life of famous Notre Dame football coach Knute Rockne, Cedar Point is featured at a pivotal point in the story. In 1913, Knute works as a lifeguard on a beach at Cedar Point, where he and his college roommate Gus Dorais worked on the forward pass. The concept, which was first used in a scrimmage game at Cedar Point, would revolutionize the sport and the film would later be preserved in the Library of Congress National Film Registry. In 2004, an independently produced film, Close Encounters of the Fourth Kind: Infestation From Mars, was shot at several historic locations around Sandusky including Cedar Point. Dick Kinzel, CEO of Cedar Fair at the time, had a brief speaking role in the film.

In the 2006 book The Warrior Heir by Cinda Williams Chima, the main characters take a field trip to Cedar Point with their high school class. In a 2010 episode of Bert the Conqueror on the Travel Channel, Bert takes the "Foursome Fearsome" roller-coaster challenge in which he rides the four fastest and tallest coasters in the park in under an hour. A 2012 episode of Travel Channel's Off Limits takes a look at off-season maintenance at the park and features the host, Don Wildman, working with the maintenance crew on Mean Streak and Millennium Force. In 2012, the "Extreme Heights" and "Speed Demons" episodes of Insane Coaster Wars on the Travel Channel feature Cedar Point coasters Millennium Force and Top Thrill Dragster, respectively. Commentary for the series was primarily filmed at Cedar Point. In 2021 an episode of Dinner: Impossible aired featuring host Robert Irvine preparing a meal celebrating the park's 150th anniversary.

See also

 List of former Cedar Point attractions
 Incidents at Cedar Point
 HalloWeekends

References

Further reading

External links

 Official website
 Cedar Point at the Roller Coaster DataBase

 
Cedar Fair amusement parks
Landmarks in Ohio
Buildings and structures in Sandusky, Ohio
Amusement parks in Ohio
Tourist attractions in Erie County, Ohio
1870 establishments in Ohio
Amusement parks opened in 1870
Tourist attractions in Sandusky, Ohio